Abia State Polytechnic is a state government owned Polytechnic established in 1992 and located in Aba, Abia State, Nigeria. The Polytechnic is composed of different schools, such as the School of Science & Engineering and the School of Business Administration.

The school's colors are yellow and dark red. The former rector is Onukaogu Abalogun A. The Polytechnic is in close proximity to the Eyimba International Stadium in Aba.

Faculties and courses offered 
According to the latest version of JAMB admission brochure, Abia State Polytechnic offers the following courses/programmes at National Diploma (ND) level.

School of Business and Management Technology
 Accountancy
 Banking and Finance
 Business Administration and Management
 Public Administration
 Office Management and Technology
School of Engineering Technology
 Civil Engineering Technology (ND only)
 Computer Engineering Technology (ND only)
 Electrical Electronics Engineering Technology (ND only)
 Mechanical Engineering Technology (ND only)
School of Environmental Design and Technology
 Architecture
 Building Technology
 Estate Management
 Quantity Surveying
 Urban and Regional Planning
 Surveying and Geo-Informatics
School of Food Science and Technology
 Food Science and Technology (ND only)
School of Science and Engineering Technology
 Computer Science 
 School of Science and Industrial Technology
 Science Laboratory Technology
 Statistics
Physics with Electronics 
Courses like Biology/Microbiology and Chemistry/Biochemistry are only available at HND level.

See also 
 List of polytechnics in Nigeria

References

External links 
 Abia State Polytechnic

Universities and colleges in Nigeria
Education in Abia State
Buildings and structures in Aba, Abia